Anywhere with You (formerly titled We the Coyotes) is a 2018 French-American drama film written and directed by Hanna Ladoul and Marco La Via and starring Morgan Saylor and McCaul Lombardi.

Synopsis
The story follows young couple Amanda and Jake's first 24 hours in Los Angeles after uprooting and driving cross-country from Illinois for Amanda's upcoming job interview with a record company. Their relationship is tested as they face financial setbacks and other struggles trying to find their footing in their new world.

Cast
Morgan Saylor as Amanda
McCaul Lombardi as Jake
Betsy Brandt as Jeanine
Khleo Thomas as Danny
Lorelei Linklater as Katie
Cameron Crovetti as Tim
Nicholas Crovetti as Dylan
Vivian Bang as Jennifer
Ravil Isyanov as Lazlo

Release
The film premiered at the 2018 Cannes Film Festival and was released on February 5, 2019.

Reception
Sheri Linden of The Hollywood Reporter gave the film a positive review, calling it "A valentine to the fringes, modestly proportioned and keenly observed."

References

External links